Bodu may refer to:

Bodu River, tributary of the Râul Mare in Romania
Sebastian Bodu (born 1970), Romanian politician